The Upper Maleri Formation is a sedimentary rock formation found in Telangana, India. It is one of the formations of the Pranhita–Godavari Basin. It is of late Norian and possibly earliest Rhaetian ages (Late Triassic), and is notable for its fossils of early dinosaurs.

Vertebrate fauna 
Angistorhinus sp., cf. Leptosuchus, Aetosauria indet., a guaibasaurid (ISI R277) and 2 basal dinosauriforms (ISI R282, 284) have also been recovered from it.

Correlations 
The formation has been correlated with the Forest Sandstone of Africa, the lower Caturrita Formation of the Paraná Basin in Brazil, the upper Ischigualasto Formation and lower Los Colorados Formation of the Ischigualasto-Villa Unión Basin of Argentina, and the Chinle Formation of North America.

See also 
 List of dinosaur-bearing rock formations

References

Bibliography

Further reading 
 

Geologic formations of India
Triassic System of Asia
Triassic India
Norian Stage
Fossiliferous stratigraphic units of Asia
Paleontology in India